The 2013 NATC trials season was the 40th season. It consisted of ten trials events in three main classes: Pro, Expert and Womens Expert Sportsman. It began on 15 June, with round one in New York and ended with round ten in Minnesota on 25 August.

Season summary
Patrick Smage would claim his fifth NATC Trials Championship in 2013.

2013 NATC trials season calendar

Scoring system
Points were awarded to the top twenty finishers in each class. The best of nine rounds counted for the Pro class, and the best of six in Expert and Women's Expert Sportsman classes were counted.

NATC Pro final standings

{|
|

NATC Expert final standings

{|
|

NATC Women's Expert Sportsman final standings

{|
|

References

Motorcycle trials
2013 in motorcycle sport